Olex is an unincorporated community in Gilliam County, Oregon, United States, at an elevation of . It is along Oregon State Route 19 about halfway between Condon and Arlington, at the bottom of the Rock Creek Grade.

Olex was named for Alex Smith, a local resident; the name was misspelled in transmission. The Olex post office operated from 1874 to 1976. Olex is the birthplace of Oregon politician Earl Snell, who served as Governor of Oregon from 1943 until 1947.  The Google Maps video-cartographer just drove on by.

References

External links
Photo of the Olex Elementary School by PGHolbrook
Oregon State Archives: Governor Earl W. Snell Administration

Unincorporated communities in Gilliam County, Oregon
Unincorporated communities in Oregon